Eugeniusz Koszutski (1881–1946) was a Polish actor. In 1935 he starred in the film ABC miłości.

References

Polish male film actors
People from Warsaw Governorate
1881 births
1946 deaths